Central Memorial High School is a public senior high school located in the southwest community of North Glenmore in Calgary, Alberta, Canada.  The school falls under the jurisdiction of the Calgary Board of Education.  The school houses unique programs that include the School of Performing and Visual Arts, and the National Sport Academy.

History
The school's name commemorates the original Central Collegiate Institute and Central High School first built in the early 20th century.  The school's history dates back as far as 1888, when the school opened its doors to 171 students (28 of which were high school students).  The start of the 20th century Central High eventually became overcrowded, forcing the school board to move students to a new high school called City Hall School which was Calgary's first district high school. The name of the new school did not sit well with the students which preferred the name Central High.  The school was nicknamed Sleepy Hollow High. The school was eventually renamed to James Short High.

By the end of the decade James Short School could no longer accommodate Calgary's growing population, so the city's school board of governors approved a new site for a new high school named Calgary Collegiate Institute, located on the corner of 13th Avenue and 8th Street S.W.  One hundred and one students attended the newly developed high school.  The high schoolers were still discontent with the name, and continued the call their school Central High.  By the 1920s, the name Calgary Collegiate Institute faded into history, and Central High was adopted.

As the city grew in both population and physical size, the Board of Education decided to close Central High in 1965 and transfer its students to Western Canada High School, only a few blocks away. The new Central Memorial High School was opened three years later amid the growing southwest communities of Lakeview, Altadore, and North Glenmore. Before the closure of CFB Calgary in 1998, Central Memorial was also the designated public high school for dependents of military families living in private married quarters at the base.

The school is not part of the Action for Bright Children Society as they seem to be inactive at this time.

Performing Visual Arts 
The school now houses a program formed in 2003 named The Centre for Performing and Visual Arts at Central Memorial High School. Students audition in their grade 9 year for entry into one of 8 disciplines; Theatre Arts, Band, Choral, Dance, Strings, Visual Arts, Media Design Arts, and Fashion Design Studies. Each student has at least 1 class with their discipline each day, with the prospect of more class time before and after school. Each specific program is taught by a team of skilled and talented teachers with high experience in their field of work. Since 2010, the graduating class of that year has the opportunity to participate in a trip to New York City in which they would take classes in their field of discipline with opportunities to explore others as well. The Music program not only goes on this trip, but also has its own trips it produces each year, with an international trip every 3 years with both the Instrumental and Vocal Programs, as well as a continental trip every other 2 years. The program's goal is to produce experienced artists and creative thinkers into the work place so as to carry on their trade or apply their experiences in the professional world. While being strict on their policy towards being in one discipline, there are occasions in which students, who make the academic and experiential standard, are allowed to be in 2 certain disciplines, such as both a performing and visual art. The program continues today to be one of the leading schools in Calgary and Alberta of the arts at a secondary level.

Career and Technology Centre (CTC)
The Career and Technology Centre (CTC) at Central Memorial High School provides students with access to rigorous academic and technical curriculum in preparation for further education and careers in high-skill, high-demand occupations. Working with experts, students access industry standard, high quality learning environments that extend into authentic work experience opportunities and lead to recognized post-secondary and industry credentials. Igniting student passions and interest at the CTC supports success both within and beyond their schooling experiences.

Some examples of programs offered at the CTC include Auto Body, Computer Science, Cosmetology, Culinary Arts, Media Design & Communication, Energy & Environmental Innovation, Pre-Engineering, and Welding/Fabrication.

Athletics
The Central Memorial Rams' athletic teams competes and participates in the Calgary Zone of the Alberta Schools Athletic Association.  The school holds membership in the Calgary Senior High School Athletic Association. The Central Memorial Rams were also noted for their City Championship football playoff run where they went undefeated during the regular season and went on to win the City Championship title for the year of 2007.
The National Sports Academy is also run through Central Memorial High, where renown coaches instruct students on how to become great athletes. The National Sports Academy includes sports such as Hockey, Baseball, Golf, and Lacrosse.

See also
 Center West Campus

References

External links
Central Memorial High School
Calgary Board of Education
The Centre for Performing and Visual Arts at Central Memorial High School

High schools in Calgary
Educational institutions established in 1888
1888 establishments in Canada